is a 1996 Japanese film based on the manga Me wo Tojite Daite by Shungiku Uchida. The film is directed by Itsumichi Isomura and stars Kumiko Takeda, Kazuya Takahashi and Natsue Yoshimura. It was released in theaters on July 13, 1996 in Japan. The movie was released in North American on subtitled only VHS on November 23, 1998 and then on DVD on January 13, 2004 by Central Park Media under their Asia Pulp Cinema label.

Plot
Amane (Kazuya Takahashi) is a regular office worker who is bored with life. His girlfriend Juri (Natsue Yoshimura) pressures him to put their relationship to the next level. However, he is uncomfortable in the relationship. One day, as he is driving, he hits a woman who was walking on the road. She is taken to the hospital where she eventually recovers. Guilty of what he's done, Amane tells her to let him repay her for the accident, but she declines and disappears from the hospital. Obsessed since their encounter, he finally finds her one night at a nightclub and learns that her name is Hanabusa. He also learns that the nightclub has transvestites and that Hanabusa (Kumiko Takeda) is a hermaphrodite. Amane is disgusted at first, but goes along with her for the rest of the night. After that night Amane longs to see Hanabusa and they have sex one night. Hanabusa shows Amane on how to be the perfect partner in sex both on top and bottom. Satisfied with this, Amane breaks up with Juri and both Hanabusa and Amane fall in love. Juri is upset and tries to confront Hanabusa, but ends up sleeping with her through the night. The next morning, Juri (while having enjoyed that she slept with Hanabusa) is even more angry at Amane and has sex with one of his co-workers, Takayanagi (Kunihiko Ida). Meanwhile, Amane and Hanabusa drive to Amane's hometown and Amane purposes that Hanabusa should meet his family. However, Hanabusa refuses and tells him to pull over. Amane is confused by this and states that he want to further their relationship. Hanabusa does not want to and suggests that they should break up. Amane confronts her and angrily states that there is no place for someone like her. She responds by telling him to run over her again. They sit silently in the car, as Amane is trying to start the car. But he is angry and tells Hanabusa that he is lonely and desperately in love with her. Hanabusa still suggests they should just end their relationship. Later, Takayanagi reveals to Amane that he slept with Juri half-way and suggests that he and Juri reconcile. But Amane tells him that he is better off not seeing her or Hanabusa. But in reality, he is more depressed and alone. The next morning, Hanabusa is walking and finds Amane sitting in the snow. He gives back the heel from one of her shoes and leaves. But Hanabusa stops him and realizes that they should be lovers and mend their relationship. Meanwhile, Juri finds out that her period is late and uses this as a way to get back together with Amane and tries to push him into marrying her. However, Amane and Hanabusa believes she is lying, which makes her upset and she leaves. She later leaves a message on his voice-mail, threatening to commit suicide by drug overdose, blaming Amane for leaving her and pleading to him to come back to her one more time. The last scene in the film is Hanabusa and Amane visiting a now comatose Juri in the hospital. Amane says that this is the end, while Hanabusa remarks that it is not the end, but just the beginning.

Cast

Japanese Cast
 Kumiko Takeda as Hanabusa
 Kazuya Takahashi as Amane
 Natsue Yoshimura as Juri
 Kunihiko Ida as Takayanagi
 Yoshiko Ichinose as Itsuko
 Shinobu Sato as Doctor
 Koji Sueyoshi as Nanaomi

English Vocal Cast
 Suzy Prue as Hanabusa
 J.K. Ellemeno as Amane
 Petra Kosic as Juri
 Fenton Lawless as Takayanagi
 Angora Deb as Itsuko, Additional Voices

Reception
The film holds at 43% at Rotten Tomatoes.

References

External links

1996 films
Live-action films based on manga
Japanese LGBT-related films
1996 romantic drama films
Japanese romantic drama films
Central Park Media
Films about intersex
1990s Japanese films